Tunisia (TUN) competed at the 1979 Mediterranean Games in Split, Yugoslavia.

External links
 Mediterranean Games Athletics results at Gbrathletics.com
 1979 SPLIT (YUG) at CIJM web site

Nations at the 1979 Mediterranean Games
1979